Pachter may refer to:

 The holder of a pacht, a revenue or tax farm in the Dutch East Indies and Dutch Cape Colony

People with the surname
Charles Pachter (born 1942), Canadian contemporary artist
Henry Pachter (1907–1980), German American political writer and philosopher
Lior Pachter (born 1973), American computational biologist
Marc Pachter (born 1942 or 1943), American museum director